Richard Dupras (born January 1, 1950) is a Canadian former professional ice hockey player.

During the 1973–74 season, Dupras played two games in the World Hockey Association with the Toronto Toros. As a youth, he played in the 1961 and 1962 Quebec International Pee-Wee Hockey Tournaments with LaSalle.

References

External links

1950 births
Living people
Canadian ice hockey centres
Ice hockey people from Montreal
Maine Nordiques players
Mohawk Valley Comets players
Toronto Toros players